Heather Watson was the defending champion from when the tournament was last held in 2019 as part of the ITF Women's World Tennis Tour,  but lost in the second round to Chloé Paquet.

Valentini Grammatikopoulou won the title, defeating Lucia Bronzetti in the final, 6–2, 6–4.

Seeds

Draw

Finals

Top half

Bottom half

Qualifying

Seeds

Qualifiers

Lucky loser

Qualifying draw

First qualifier

Second qualifier

Third qualifier

Fourth qualifier

References

Main Draw
Qualifying Draw

Odlum Brown Vancouver Open - Women's singles